The 1953 24 Heures de Spa Francorchamps took place on 25 and 26 July 1953, at the Circuit de Spa-Francorchamps, (Belgium).  It was also the fourth round of the FIA World Sports Car Championship. This was the first time the event had taken place since Luigi Chinetti and Jean Lucas won in 1949. The race was not run again until 1964.

Although the 1953 season places two 24 hour races in two months would not be an easy maneuver. But, Spa is a favourite amongst the drivers and teams, therefore, the event would be a popular one, not to be missed by the top teams and their star drivers

Report

Entry

A grand total 43 racing cars were registered for this event, of which 40 arrived for practise and qualifying. From Italy, the two work teams of Scuderia Ferrari and S. P. A. Alfa Romeo. The Scuderia from Maranello arrived with three cars, all 375 MM's. In the cockpits sat the driver pairings, Giuseppe Farina / Mike Hawthorn, Luigi Villoresi / Alberto Ascari and Umberto Maglioli with Piero Carini . Alfa Romeo brought two cars to Belgium, which went into different classes at the start. Juan Manuel Fangio and Consalvo Sanesi piloted an Alfa Romeo 6C 3000 CM in the sports car category. Max Thirion, together with Mario Damonte were entered in an Alfa Romeo 1900 in the touring car class.
The host country was represented by the Ecurie Francorchamps, which entered a Jaguar C-Type and a Ferrari 212 Export.

Qualifying

The Ferrari 375 MM of Mike Hawthorn took pole position, averaging a speed of 113.871 mph around the 8.77 mile circuit. However, following an accident in practise, the Fiat 1100 of “Thillios” and Johnny Claes was withdrawn, leaving 39 cars to start.

Race

The day of the race would be warm and dry, but that would mean very little as the team prepared for the start at 4pm. As the field took off, it wouldn't be long before the Circuit de Spa-Francorchamps would prove to be a greater threat, even to the best teams and drivers in the race.

A number of privateers entries would fall out of contention early into the race, but then, the factory efforts and the bigger privateers began to run into trouble. Roger Laurent and Jacques Swaters would retire their C-Type with a blown engine. Fangio and Sanesi would be out following an accident in their Alfa Romeo 6C. The Ferrari pairing of Maglioli and Carini would be amongst the casualties with value troubles. It did not get any easier for the top drivers as even Ascari and Villoresi would retire with clutch failure.

Although two of the three works Ferraris had retired during the race, Scuderia victory was never seriously threatened. After Fangio/Sanesi accident after only 22 laps, the Ferrari was without any close competition. Farina and Hawthorn would remain in the lead throughout the whole race, even when the rain came late on in the race. At the finish, Farina and Hawthorn had an 18 lap advantage over the Jaguar C-Type of the Scottish Ecurie Ecosse. In the end, the Ferrari margin of victory amounted to about an advantage of close to 90 minutes over James Scott Douglas and Guy Gale. A Belgian-entered Jaguar C-Type of Herman Roosdorp and Toni Ulmen was a further eleven laps down and finished third. In the touring car class, the Portuguese driver Viegas Vellagao and his Belgian co-driver, Vladimir Narichkine were victorious in their Mercedes-Benz 220. However, although they were fifth overall, they were 68 laps behind the winning Ferrari. The winning partnership, won in a time of 24hr 02:07.085mins., averaging a speed of 94.910 mph. They covered a distance of 2,281.182 miles.

Official Classification

Class Winners are in Bold text.

 Fastest Lap: Giuseppe Farina, 4:44.0secs (111.217 mph)

Class Winners

Standings after the race

Note: Only the top five positions are included in this set of standings.
Championship points were awarded for the first six places in each race in the order of 8-6-4-3-2-1. Manufacturers were only awarded points for their highest finishing car with no points awarded for positions filled by additional cars. Only the best 4 results out of the 7 races could be retained by each manufacturer. Points earned but not counted towards the championship totals are listed within brackets in the above table.

References

Spa
Spa 24 Hours
1953 in Belgian sport